7-Eleven is an international chain of convenience stores.

7-Eleven, 7/11 or 07-11 may also refer to:

July 11
Montgomery 7-11, an American sailing dinghy that has a length overall of 7' 11"
November 7
7-Eleven (cycling team), a professional road-racing team 1981–1996
"7/11" (song), a song by Beyoncé
"7-11", a song by the Ramones from Pleasant Dreams
"Seven Eleven", a song by GE & GM from A Bugged Out Mix

See also
711 (disambiguation)
11/7 (disambiguation)
117 (disambiguation)
Blackjack, featuring the 7-11-21 rule